Louis Anseaume (1721 – 7 July 1784 in Paris) was a French playwright and librettist.

He contributed the words for operas by André Ernest Modeste Grétry, Pierre-Alexandre Monsigny, Egidio Romualdo Duni, Christoph Willibald Gluck, and François-André Danican Philidor. He is credited with developing the genre of comédie mêlée d'ariettes (comedy mixed with ariettes), a type of opéra comique.
A prompter and répétiteur at Comédie Italienne, he was deputy director of the Opéra-Comique and wrote some forty plays, often in collaboration with Charles-Simon Favart, including several opéras-comiques with Duni :
Le Chinois poli en France (1754)
Le Peintre amoureux de son modèle (1757), music by Duni
La Fausse Esclave (1758), music by Gluck
Cendrillon (1759), music by Laruette
L'Île des fous (1760), music by Duni
Mazet (1761), music by Duni
Le Milicien (1762), music by Duni
Les Deux Chasseurs et la Laitière (1763), music by Duni
La Clochette (1766), music by Duni
Le tableau parlant (1769), music by Grétry

He was one of the founders of the French opéra comique genre.

Sources 
The Oxford Dictionary of Opera, by John Warrack and Ewan West (1992), .

External links 
 His plays and their presentations on CÉSAR
 Cendrillon
 Louis Anseaume dans les Anecdotes dramatiques de 1775

18th-century French dramatists and playwrights
French opera librettists
Writers from Paris
1721 births
1784 deaths